Christopher Quiring (born 23 November 1990) is a German footballer who plays for VSG Altglienicke.

Career
Quiring joined Union Berlin as a youth in 2002 and made his first-team and professional debut in 2010. In total, he played 130 matches in the 2. Bundesliga and 5 in the DFB-Pokal for the club scoring 19 goals.

In January 2017, left Union Berlin to join Hansa Rostock having only made three substitute appearances in the first half of the 2016–17 season.

Career statistics

References

External links
 
 1. FC Union profile 

1990 births
Living people
German footballers
Association football midfielders
Footballers from Berlin
1. FC Union Berlin players
FC Hansa Rostock players
2. Bundesliga players
3. Liga players
VSG Altglienicke players